Sheila Browne may refer to:
 Sheila Browne (musician), American-Irish concert violist
 Sheila Browne (educator) (1924–2015), English academic specialising in Medieval French